Killing My Darlings is the debut studio album from Swedish singer Amanda Jenssen, who rose to fame in Idol 2007. It was released in stores on May 7, 2008. The album received mostly highly positive remarks from the media. It sold platinum in Sweden during its first months in stores.

Track listing

Bonus Tracks

Charts

Weekly charts

Year-end charts

Certifications

References

2008 debut albums
Amanda Jenssen albums